The 1995 Meath Intermediate Football Championship is the 69th edition of the Meath GAA's premier club Gaelic football tournament for intermediate graded teams in County Meath, Ireland. The tournament consists of 17 teams. The championship starts with a group stage and then progresses to a knock out stage.

This was St. Brigid's Ballinacree's debut in the middle grade as they were promoted from the J.F.C. after claiming the 1994 Meath Junior Football Championship title.

On 24 September 1995, Simonstown Gaels claimed their 1st Intermediate championship title when they defeated Castletown 0–16 to 2–9 in the final at Pairc Tailteann.

Team changes

The following teams have changed division since the 1994 championship season.

From I.F.C.
Promoted to S.F.C.
 Kilmainhamwood -  (Intermediate Champions)

Relegated to 1995 J.A.F.C.
 Dunsany
 Meath Hill
 Navan O'Mahonys 'B'
 Nobber

To I.F.C.
Regraded from S.F.C.
 None

Promoted from 1994 J.A.F.C.
 St. Brigid's Ballinacree  - (Junior 'A' Champions)
 Blackhall Gaels - (New club formed in 1995 from Junior clubs Batterstown and Kilcloon. Chose to play in the Intermediate grade this year.)

Group stage
There are 4 groups called Group A, B, C and D. The top two finishers in all groups will qualify for the quarter finals.

Group A

Round 1:
 Blackhall Gaels 1-11, 2-3 Gaeil Colmcille 'B', 16/4/1995,
 Simonstown Gaels 0–10, 1-7 Cortown, 16/4/1995,
 Ballinabrackey 4-11, 1-6 Ballivor, 16/4/1995,

Round 2:
 Gaeil Colmcille 'B' 0-13, 0-12 Cortown, 30/4/1995,
 Simonstown 1-15, 0-7 Ballivor, 30/4/1995,
 Ballinabrackey 2-10, 2-8 Blackhall Gaels, 30/4/1995,

Round 3:
 Gaeil Colmcille 'B' 2-8, 2-6 Ballivor, 14/5/1995,
 Simonstown Gaels 1-15, 0-5 Ballinabrackey, 14/5/1995,
 Blackhall Gaels 0–9, 0-9 Cortown, 14/5/1995,

Round 4:
 Ballinabrackey 2-4, 1-5 Cortown, 4/6/1995,
 Blackhall Gaels w/o, scr Ballivor, 11/6/1995,
 Simonstown Gaels 2-11, 0-6 Gaeil Colmcille 'B', 25/6/1995,

Round 5:
 Simonstown Gaels 4-9, 1-11 Blackhall Gaels, 2/7/1995,
 Cortown w/o, scr Ballivor,
 Ballinabrackey w, l Gaeil Colmcille 'B',

Group B

Round 1:
 St. Patrick's 0-11, 1-6 Castletown, 16/4/1995,
 Dunshaughlin 0-9, 0-5 Moynalty, 16/4/1995,
 St. Ultan's 0–9, 1-6 St. Brigid's, 16/4/1995,

Round 2:
 Castletown 3-9, 3-6 St. Ultan's, 30/4/1995,
 St. Brigid's 2-6, 0-7 Moynalty, 30/4/1995,
 Dunshaughlin 0-11, 1-7 St. Patrick's, 30/4/1995,

Round 3:
 St. Patrick's 0-10, 1-1 Moynalty, 14/5/1995,
 Dunshaughlin 2-16, 0-12 St. Ultan's, 14/5/1995,
 Castletown 2-12, 1-5 St. Brigid's, 28/5/1995,

Round 4:
 Dunshaughlin 1-15, 0-4 St. Brigid's, 11/6/1995,
 St. Patrick's 5-9, 1-7 St. Ultan's, 18/6/1995,
 Castletown 1-13, 0-5 Moynalty, 18/6/1995,

Round 5:
 Castletown 0-10, 1-4 Moynalty, 2/7/1995,
 St. Patrick's w, l St. Brigid's, 
 St. Ultan's w, l Moynalty,

Quarter-Final Playoff:
 Castletown w, l St. Patrick's,
 St. Patrick's w, l Dunshaughlin,

Group C

Round 1:
 Syddan 1-7, 0-8 Donaghmore,
 St. Mary's 1-14, 1-8 Athboy, 16/4/1995,
 Rathkenny - Bye,

Round 2:
 Rathkenny 1-11, 2-4 St. Mary's, 30/4/1995,
 Donaghmore w, l Athboy,
 Syddan - Bye,

Round 3:
 Rathkenny 1-12, 0-6 Syddan, 14/5/1995,
 St. Mary's w, l Donaghmore,
 Athboy - Bye,

Round 4:
 Syddan 1-6, 0-6 St. Mary's, 11/6/1995,
 Rathkenny 4-13, 1-8 Athboy, 18/6/1995,
 Donaghmore - Bye,

Round 5:
 Rathkenny 1-9, 0-4 Donaghmore, 16/7/1995,
 Syddan 0-16, 0-4 Athboy, 16/7/1995,
 St. Mary's - Bye,

Knock-out Stages

Finals
The teams in the quarter-finals are the second placed teams from each group and the Group A winner. The teams in the semi finals are Group B and C winners along with the quarter final winners.

Quarter-Final:
 Syddan 1-9, 0-6 Ballinabrackey, 27/8/1995,
 Rathkenny 1-10, 0-6 St. Patrick's, 27/8/1995,

Semi-Final:
 Simonstown Gaels 2-9, 0-2 Rathkenny, 10/9/1995,
 Castletown 1-9, 1-8 Syddan, 10/9/1995,

Final:
 Simonstown Gaels 0-16, 2-9 Castletown, Pairc Tailteann, 24/10/1995,

References

External links

Meath Intermediate Football Championship
Meath Intermediate Football Championship